is a district of Hanamigawa Ward, Chiba City, Chiba Prefecture, Japan, consisting of 1-chōme to 3-chōme, and 5-chōme.

Demographics
The number of households and population as of December 2017 are shown below.

Transportation

Railroads
 Keisei Electric Railway – Keisei Chiba Line

References

Chiba (city)